Jameel Khan is an Indian actor famously known for his tv series Gullak. Born in Bhadohi, Uttar Pradesh, Khan was educated at Sherwood College, Nainital and Aligarh Muslim University. He moved to Mumbai to pursue his acting career, and has acted in films such as Asambhav, Gangs of Wasseypur, Goliyon Ki Rasleela Ram-Leela and Baby. He also acted in Beneath the Sea of Lights starring Academy Award Nominee Barkhad Abdi and Jim Sarbh.

Filmography

Films
1999 — Straight from the Heart  - Nimesh
2003 — Chalte Chalte - Traffic Policeman
2004 — Asambhav - Atul Bhatnagar
2007 — Loins of Punjab Presents - Mr. Bokade
2007 — Cheeni Kum 
2008 — Rock On!! - Tolani
2010 — Badmaash Company - Archie
2010 — 24 Hrs - Salim
2011 — Jo Dooba So Paar: It's Love in Bihar! - Gangster
2012 — Gangs of Wasseypur – Part 1 - Asgar Khan
2012 — Gangs of Wasseypur – Part 2 - Asgar Khan
Das Capital - Gulaamon ki Rajdhani BDO Officer
Bloody Mustache - Short Film
2012 — Oass - Baadu
2013 — Goliyon Ki Rasleela Ram Leela - Vanka
2015 — Guddu ki Gun - Marwaadi Don
2015 — All Is Well - Police officer
2015 — Baby - Taufiq
2015 — Phantom - Wedding singer
2017 — Tiger Zinda Hai
2017 — Theeran Adhigaram Ondru - Police Informer
2017 — Firangi - Hakeem
2018 — Phamous - Amay
2019 — Setters 
2019 — Blank
2019 - Pagalpanti - Panditji
2019 - The Desert Son (Short film)
2020 - Das Capital Gulamon ki Rajdhani
2020 - Beneath a sea of lights - Vinay
2021 - Pagglait - Ghanshyam
2021 - 14 Phere - Amay

Television

Accolades

References

External links
 
 

Living people
Male actors from Uttar Pradesh
People from Bhadohi district
Male actors in Hindi cinema
21st-century Indian male actors
Year of birth missing (living people)